Gilbert Car Company was a railroad car builder based in Troy, New York. It began manufacturing streetcars in the late 1880s.  Gilbert cars were sold and exported worldwide.

Founded by Orsamus Eaton (1792–1872) and Uri Gilbert (1809–1888), the company changed names several times as the partnership changed:

 1830 Eaton and Gilbert
 1844 Eaton, Gilbert & Co
 1862 Uri Gilbert and Son
 1864 Gilbert, Bush & Company

 1879 Gilbert & Bush Co
 1882 Gilbert Car Manufacturing Co
 1889 Taylor Electric Truck Company

In 1879, Gilbert leased the Buffalo Car Works facility in Buffalo, which had a capacity of five to twelve new cars per day. The Gilbert company saw some success in 1881 when it secured an order for several hundred refrigerator cars for the newly established American Refrigerator Transit Company. In 1886, Gilbert leased the Jones Car Works of Schenectady.

Following the Panic of 1893, and the death in March 1893 of company president Edward Gilbert, son of Uri Gilbert, the company entered receivership in August 1893. Only a few months earlier, Gilbert had completed construction of a hundred cars for New York Central Railroad passenger trains. Then in 1895, the company stopped building rail cars.  Upon closure, the plant value was estimated at $400,000.  In 1899, the plant was rumored to be the target of acquisition for conversion into an automobile manufacturing facility.

Products
 freight cars
 passenger cars
 drawing room cars
 sleepers
 monitor roof or clerestory ("clear-story") cars
 horse cars

See also 
 List of rolling stock manufacturers

References 

Defunct rolling stock manufacturers of the United States
Troy, New York
Manufacturing companies based in New York (state)
Manufacturing companies established in 1830
1830 establishments in New York (state)
Vehicle manufacturing companies disestablished in 1895
Tram manufacturers